Bischofberger is a surname. Notable people with the surname include:

Annemarie Bischofberger (born 1960), Swiss alpine skier
Bruno Bischofberger (born 1940), Swiss art dealer
Erwin Bischofberger (1936–2012), Swedish Jesuit and medical practitioner
Marc Bischofberger (born 1991), Swiss freestyle skier
Norbert Bischofberger (born 1956), Austrian scientist